Belarus participated in the Junior Eurovision Song Contest 2020 in Warsaw, Poland. Belarusian Television and Radio Company (BTRC) selected Arina Pehtereva with her song "Aliens" through an internal selection. She achieved 5th place with 130 points.

As of 2022, this was Belarus' last entry to compete in the contest, before the country was expelled from the EBU the following year.

Background

The country previously hosted the  contest in Minsk and hosted for a second year in 2018, with Daniel Yastremski representing the country with the song "Time". It placed 11th with 114 points.

Before Junior Eurovision 
In July 2020, the Belarusian broadcaster Belarusian Television and Radio Company (BTRC) revealed it would pick its representative either via a national final or internal selection, depending on the situation in the country at a later date. A registration period was opened on 15 July and lasted until 15 August, after which up to 15 finalists were picked to compete in the final. In the end, BTRC decided not to hold a televised national final and instead selected its entry internally, due to 2020 Belarusian protests and stating "it would be impossible to meet the social distancing requirement" had a national final been held. On 8 October 2020, BTRC announced that Arina Pehtereva would represent Belarus in the Junior Eurovision Song Contest 2020 with the song "Aliens".

At Junior Eurovision
After the opening ceremony, which took place on 23 November 2020, it was announced that Belarus will perform fifth on 29 November 2020, following Serbia and preceding Poland.

Voting

Detailed voting results

References 

Junior Eurovision Song Contest
Belarus
2020